Notizie del mondo (Italian for News of the world) was a newspaper published in Venice from 1778 to 1812 and later in 1815. Along with the Nuovo Postiglione, it was the main newspaper covering foreign affairs printed in Venice in that time, arriving to circulation of more than two thousand copies.

History

On 22 August 1778 the Government of the Republic of Venice authorized Antonio Graziosi to publish a new newspaper. Because the existing newspaper Il Nuovo Postiglione already had the formal monopoly, the permission was granted subject that the new newspaper of Antonio Graziosi was only a reprint of a foreign newspaper.

The first issue of Notizie del mondo of Venice was issued on 28 November 1778. It stated to be a reprint with additions of the newspaper with the same name published in Florence since 1768. Notizie del mondo of Venice had initially in its first page two dates, the date of Florence and the actual date of printing in Venice. The content was however completely independent from the newspaper of Florence. Since the first number of 1779, the Venetian Notizie del mondo quit the graphic design of the Florentine Notizie del mondo. Since the first number of 1785, the double dates were no more used; and since the issue 85 of the same year disappeared the indication to be a reprint.

The Notizie del mondo of Venice had a good reception by the public. The circulation in 1782 was higher than 2000 copies. It was mainly sold as annual or biannual subscription in all main towns of North Italy, but only in Venice it was possible to buy single issues. The annual cost of subscription was one sequin.

The Notizie del mondo covered mainly foreign politic affair, with fresh news from France. The editorial line of the Graziosi was slightly in favor of the French revolution and against the politic line of the Patriarchate of Venice.

From 1789 the editor-in-chief was Giuseppe Compagnoni, who resigned in 1794 when the censorship became more stiff due to the revolutionary events in France. After the Compagnoni, the editor-in-chief became the Sicilian abbot Saverio Scrofani.

Notizie del mondo was published two times a week up to 22 May 1797, daily up to 1800 when it returned to be published two times a week. From 5 July 1808 it was published three times a week, from 1809 the periodicity changed many times and in 1815 it was again published daily. The length was usually eight pages when published two times a week, four pages when published more often.

By order of the government of the Kingdom of Italy, on 14 March 1812 the publications were interrupted along with all other newspapers in Venice, substituted by the Giornale dipartimentale dell'Adriatico published however always by the Graziosi under the direction of Antonio Caminer.

The Notizie del mondo was resumed in early 1815 and published daily that year. The last number was published on 30 December 1815.

Notes

References

Defunct newspapers published in Italy
Italian-language newspapers
Mass media in Venice
Publications established in 1778

Publications disestablished in 1815